Jujhar Khaira  (born August 13, 1994) is a Canadian professional ice hockey centre currently playing for the Chicago Blackhawks of the National Hockey League (NHL). He has also played for the Edmonton Oilers.

Playing career
Khaira was drafted by the Oilers after his second season in the British Columbia Hockey League with the Prince George Spruce Kings.  Shortly after the draft, Khaira committed to play collegiate hockey with Michigan Tech of the Western Collegiate Hockey Association.

At the completion of his freshman season in 2012–13 with the Huskies, Khaira left college to pursue a major junior career closer to home in the Western Hockey League with the Everett Silvertips. On August 7, 2013, he was signed to a three-year entry-level contract with the Edmonton Oilers after being selected in the second round of the NHL draft during the previous year. In the following 2013–14 season, Khaira posted 43 points in 59 games with the Silvertips. At the elimination in first-round of the post-season, Khaira then made his professional debut with the Oilers AHL affiliate, the Oklahoma City Barons, joining the club for their post-season run.

In the second year of his entry-level contract, Khaira and the Oilers AHL affiliation moved to the new Bakersfield Condors.  During this 2015–16 NHL season, Khaira was called up to the Oilers on November 26, 2015, playing his first NHL game against the Pittsburgh Penguins on November 28, 2015. This made Khaira only the third player of Punjabi Indian descent to play in the NHL, after Robin Bawa and Manny Malhotra.  Khaira played 15 games at the NHL level that season, earning 2 assists.

Khaira was a regular with the Condors for the 2016–17 season, and occasional call up to the NHL Oilers. During his second NHL game that season, on January 16, 2017, Khaira scored his first NHL goal, against Mike Smith of the Arizona Coyotes. On December 9 of the same year, Khaira earned his first multi-goal game, scoring twice against Carey Price of the Montreal Canadiens.

Following the  season, his sixth season in Edmonton, Khaira as a pending restricted free agent was not tendered a qualifying offer by the Oilers on July 26, 2021. 

On July 28, 2021, Khaira a two-year, $1.95 million deal with the Chicago Blackhawks. His first season in Chicago was marred with injuries. Kharia missed nearly a month after suffering a concussion following a collision with Jacob Trouba on December 7. He suffered a back injury nine games after returning that required season-ending surgery. Kharia finished the season with three goals in 27 games for the Blackhawks.

Personal
Khaira's parents were prominent volleyball players in British Columbia during the 1980s.  His brother, Sahvan Khaira, attends the University of Calgary and formerly played on the Calgary Dinos men's ice hockey team in 2019-2020.

Khaira is the third NHL player of Punjabi descent, following Robin Bawa (starting in 1989) and Manny Malhotra (starting in 1998).

Career statistics

See also
List of Indian NHL players

References

External links

1994 births
Living people
Bakersfield Condors players
Canadian expatriate ice hockey players in the United States
Canadian ice hockey left wingers
Canadian people of Punjabi descent
Canadian Sikhs
Chicago Blackhawks players
Edmonton Oilers draft picks
Edmonton Oilers players
Everett Silvertips players
Ice hockey people from British Columbia
Michigan Tech Huskies men's ice hockey players
Oklahoma City Barons players
Prince George Spruce Kings players
Sportspeople from Surrey, British Columbia